The Port of Mokpo() is a port in South Korea, located in the city of Mokpo, South Jeolla Province.

References

Mokpo